Eric William Ericson (March 16, 1858 – November 11, 1951) was an American politician. He served in the South Dakota State Senate from 1915 to 1922. He was a brother of Edward Charles Ericson.

References

Republican Party South Dakota state senators
Swedish emigrants to the United States
People from Union County, South Dakota
1858 births
1951 deaths